Guéyo Department is a department of Nawa Region in Bas-Sassandra District, Ivory Coast. In 2021, its population was 102,213 and its seat is the settlement of Guéyo. The sub-prefectures of the department are Dabouyo and Guéyo.

History
Guéyo Department was created in 2008 as a second-level subdivision via a split-off from Sassandra Department. At its creation, it was part of Bas-Sassandra Region.

In 2011, districts were introduced as new first-level subdivisions of Ivory Coast. At the same time, regions were reorganised and became second-level subdivisions and all departments were converted into third-level subdivisions. At this time, Guéyo Department became part of Nawa Region in Bas-Sassandra District.

Notes

Departments of Nawa Region
2008 establishments in Ivory Coast
States and territories established in 2008